Brian Niemeier is an American science fiction horror author. In 2016, he was a finalist for the John W. Campbell Award for Best New Writer and won the inaugural Dragon Award for Best Horror Novel.

Background
Brian Niemeier grew up in Peoria, Illinois. He attended Bradley University in Peoria for his undergraduate work, then earned an MA at the Franciscan University of Steubenville.

Writing career
Niemeier was a finalist for the John W. Campbell Award for Best New Writer in 2016, which he said was a result of his having been selected by the Sad Puppies and Rabid Puppies campaigns. The award voters ranked him sixth of five nominees, below "No Award". His second novel, Souldancer, won the inaugural Dragon Award for Best Horror Novel. When Niemeier's novel The Secret Kings was nominated at the 2017 Dragon Awards, The Verge contributor Andrew Liptak cited the book's low ratings at Goodreads (numbering 11 at the time) when discussing whether or not the Dragons were actually rewarding the works most popular with fans. Niemeier has since stated that the Dragon Awards have been taken over by the "Death Cult" by which he alleges the Hugo Awards are controlled, and that this cult "took advantage of the drastically reduced voter base to pack the ballot" in 2020. Mike Glyer, of File 770, described Niemeier as negatively spinning the results of the 2020 Dragon Awards because Niemeier's friends didn't win.

Bibliography
Works are listed chronologically in each section. All of his works are self-published unless otherwise noted.

Combat Frame Xseed series
Combat Frame Xseed (December 2018, ebook only)
Coalition Year 40 (May 2019, ebook only)
CY 40 Second Coming (December 2019, ebook only)

Other books in this series
Combat Frame Xseed S (October 2020, ebook only)
Combat Frame Xseed SS (September 2021, ebook only)

A non-fiction guide to the series was also published:
Combat Frame Xseed Illustrated Combat Frame Tech Guide (November 2020)

Soul Cycle series
Nethereal (June 2015)
Souldancer (February 2016) 
The Secret Kings (December 2016)
The Ophian Rising (December 2017)

Nonfiction
Don't Give Money to People Who Hate You (April 2020)

Collections
Strange Matter (April 2018, ebook only)

Short works
"Beta Geminorum" (January 2012, Jersey Devil Press)
"Reign of Terror" (April 2012, in Title Goes Here)
"Strange Matter" (January 2015, in Sci Phi Journal #3, edited by Jason Rennie, Robert J. Wigard, and Peter Sean Bradley)
"Izcacus" (October 2015)
"Anacyclosis" (2016, in "Sci Phi Journal")
"Hymn of the Pearl" (novella, June 2017, ebook only)
"Elegy for the Locust"
"Robber Council"
"Good Friday"

Awards

References

21st-century American novelists
American science fiction writers
American horror writers
Living people
American male novelists
21st-century American male writers
Year of birth missing (living people)